Crucifixion with Saints or Crucifixion with Mourners and Saints Bernardino of Siena, Francis of Assisi and Petronius is a 1583 oil on canvas, now in the church of Santa Maria della Carità in Bologna. The work was originally sited in the Macchiavelli chapel in San Nicolò di San Felice, Bologna, next to Santa Maria della Carità, which was destroyed by bombing during the Second World War. It was then temporarily moved to the Soprintendenza di Bologna and finally to its current home.

Dating
In Felsina Pittrice in 1678, Carlo Cesare Malvasia stated that Carracci produced the work when he was eighteen (defining it as "the first work ever to come from the great Annibale's brush") and that the commission was initially offered to Ludovico Carracci, who decided the offered payment was too little and so passed it onto his young cousin Annibale. However, this account is unreliable, since cleaning in the 1920s revealed a date of 1583 on the canvas, at which point Annibale was twenty-three. That still makes it his earliest surviving work and his first surviving work for a public audience, though it throws doubt on Malvasia's dating, since a church commission is unlikely to have been his first work, instead indicating that Carracci was already a successful artist</ref>

Malvasia also states that older and more established artists in Bologna criticised the work for excessive realism (calling its figure of Christ a "naked porter"), the composition's disharmony, the inaccurate and fast brushwork and the lack of decorum seen, for example, in Francis' calloused feet. Modern art historians instead see these features as Annibale (albeit with a youthful uncertainty) attempted to break away from the late-Mannerist style then dominant in Bologna and establish a new artistic language founded in realism.

Analysis

With a serene expression and his head tilted to the left, the figure of Christ looks down at a group of saints. Francis of Assisi kneels before the cross in front of the Virgin Mary, whilst Petronius stands on the other side in brocaded episcopal vestments, with an altar boy holding his crosier behind him, blocking the viewer's view of John the Evangelist behind them.

Gallery

References

Paintings by Annibale Carracci
Paintings in Bologna
Paintings depicting the Crucifixion of Jesus
1583 paintings
Paintings of Francis of Assisi
Paintings of Bernardino of Siena